Source may refer to:

Research
 Historical document
 Historical source
 Source (intelligence) or sub source, typically a confidential provider of non open-source intelligence
 Source (journalism), a person, publication, publishing institute or other record or document that gives information
 Source document, a document in which data collected for a clinical trial is first recorded
 Source text, in research (especially in the humanities), a source of information referred to by citation
 Primary source, a first-hand written evidence of history made at the time of the event by someone who was present
 Secondary source, a written account of history based upon the evidence from primary sources
 Tertiary source, a compilation based upon primary and secondary sources
 Sources (website), a directory of expert contacts and media spokespersons
 Open source, a philosophy of dissemination of intellectual products

Law
 Sources of international law, the materials and processes out of which the rules and principles regulating the international community are developed
 Sources of law, the materials and processes out of which law is developed

Mathematics and physics 
 Source, a point where the divergence of a vector field is positive
 Source of a representation, in finite group theory
 Source, a terminal in a field-effect transistor
 Current source, an electrical or electronic device that delivers or absorbs electric current
 Energy sources, substances or processes with high concentrations of energy
 Ion source, a device that creates atomic and molecular ions
 Light source, an object emitting light
 Point source, a single identifiable localised source of something
 Radioactive source, a known quantity of a radionuclide which emits ionizing radiation
 Sound source, an object emitting sound
 Voltage source, any device or system that produces an electromotive force between its terminals

Computing and technology
 Source (command), a UNIX command to execute commands from a file
 Communication source, objects which encode message data and transmit the information
 Source code, a file containing code for software written in a programming language
 Source theory, any process that generates successive messages in information theory
 Source (programming language), a family of sublanguages of JavaScript to support Structure and Interpretation of Computer Programs, JavaScript Adaptation

Earth and life sciences
 Inflow (hydrology), the source of the water in a lake
 Source (hydrology), the original point from which a river or stream flows
 Source rocks, rocks that have generated, or are capable of generating hydrocarbons
 Source tissue, plant tissue serving as a source of nutrients; for example see Somatic embryogenesis

Art and entertainment

Fictional entities
 Source (comics), a sentient entity who provides advice to the New Gods in the DC Multiverse
 The Source (Charmed), a fictional character on the WB television series Charmed
 The Source, a character in the 1978 US television sitcom Quark

Films
 The Source (1918 film), 1918 American drama directed by George Melford
 The Source (1999 film), a 1999 documentary film about the Beat generation
 The Source (2002 film), a 2002 science fiction film, also known as The Secret Craft in the UK and The Surge for its American DVD release
 The Source (2011 film), a 2011 French film
 Highlander: The Source, the fifth film in the Highlander franchise

Games
 Source (game engine), a game engine developed by Valve
 Source 2, the successor to Source
 Counter-Strike: Source, a 2004 complete remake of Counter-Strike using the Source game engine
 Day of Defeat: Source, a 2005 complete remake of Day of Defeat using the Source game engine

Literature
 The Source (novel), a 1965 novel by James A. Michener

Music
 The Source (musician), the production identity of UK electronic music record producer John Truelove
 The Source (band), a Norwegian jazz band
 Subsource (band), a British electronic music group
 The Source (Ali Farka Touré album), 1993 album by Ali Farka Touré
 The Source (Ayreon album), 2017 album by Arjen Anthony Lucassen's project Ayreon
 The Source (Dizzy Gillespie album), 1973 live album by Dizzy Gillespie
 The Source (Grandmaster Flash album), 1986 album by Grandmaster Flash
 The Source (Jackie McLean album), 1973 album by American saxophonist Jackie McLean
 The Source (Kendrick Scott album), 2007 album by jazz drummer Kendrick Scott
 The Source (Tony Allen album), 2017 album by drummer Tony Allen
 The Source, 1969 jazz album by Jimmy Scott
 The Source (oratorio), a 2014 oratorio by Ted Hearne
 "The Source", a song by Built to Spill from their 1994 album There's Nothing Wrong with Love
 Source (album), a 2020 album by Nubya Garcia, or the title song
 "Source", a song by Tycho from his 2016 album Epoch

Periodicals
 Source (lifestyle magazine), a bi-monthly magazine published by the John Lewis Partnership
 Source (photography magazine), a quarterly photography magazine
 The Source, a magazine of hip-hop music and culture
 The St. Thomas Source, a newspaper published in the United States Virgin Islands
 The Source (newspaper)

Radio
 The Source (network), a radio network operated in the 1970s and 1980s by NBC
 WVUR-FM or "The Source", Valparaiso University's student-run radio station

Visual arts
 Source (1/3), public artwork by U.S. artist Tony Smith
 The Source (Etrog), public artwork by artist Sorel Etrog
 The Source (Ingres), an 1856 painting by Ingres
 The Source (sculpture), an electronic moving sculpture at the London Stock Exchange
 The Source (Courbet), an 1862 painting by French artist Gustav Courbet

Organizations
 Source (International Information Support Centre), an international information support centre and digital library
 Source (UNSW), a community service provider that used to operate at the University of New South Wales in Sydney, Australia
 Source Family (1922–1975), a commune outside of 1970's Hollywood
 Source Vagabond Systems, an Israeli manufacturer using the brand "SOURCE"
 The Source (online service), an online service provider founded in 1979
 The Source (retailer), a Canadian electronics store

Places
 natural spring
 headwaters
 Les Sources, Estrie, Quebec, Canada; a regional county municipality
 Des Sources station, Montreal, Quebec, Canada; a light rail station
 Boulevard Des Sources, Montreal, Quebec, Canada; a large street

Other uses
 Operation Source, a series of attacks on German warships in 1943
 Absolute (philosophy), or the source, as the absolute principle of being

See also

 
 
 Begin (disambiguation)
 La Source (disambiguation)
 Source language (disambiguation)
 Sourceror (disambiguation)
 Sourcing (disambiguation)
 Start (disambiguation)
 Wikisource, an online library of free content textual sources